María Teresa Campos Luque (born 18 June 1941) is a Spanish journalist and television presenter.

She was born in Tétouan, then Spanish protectorate in Morocco, the third of the six children of an upper-middle-class family. She moved to Málaga in 1942 and later to Madrid.
She studied philosophy at the University of Málaga and has taken part in several radio and television programs. She is a widow and has two daughters and three grandchildren.

Books
"Cómo librarse de los hijos antes de que sea demasiado tarde" (Humor - Ed. Temas de hoy – 1993)
"Qué hombres" (Humor - Ed. Temas de hoy – 1994)
"Agobios nos da la vida" (Humor - Ed. Temas de hoy – 1997)
"Mis dos vidas" (Memorias - Ed. Planeta – 2004)
"Agobios de caminar con tacones" (Educativo - Ed. Temas de hoy – 2011)
"Princesa Letizia" (Memorias - Ed. Planeta – 2012)

Awards
Premio Ondas, "Premio Nacional de Radio", 1980 and "Mejor Labor Profesional", 2002
Antena de Oro 1994,  2000 and 2015
TP de Oro 1999 and 2004
Premio Clara Campoamor 2007 
, 2003
, "Toda una Vida", 2012

Television
Buenas noches (TVE) (Presenter)
Estudio directo (TVE) (Presenter)
Viva la tarde (TVE) (Presenter)
Diario de sesiones (TVE) (Presenter)
Por la mañana (TVE) (Presenter)
A mi manera (TVE) (Presenter)
Ésta es su casa (TVE) (Presenter)
Pasa la vida (TVE) (Presenter)
Telepasión (TVE) (Presenter)
Perdóname (TVE) (Presenter)
Tardes con Teresa (TVE) (Presenter)
Día a día (Tele 5) (Presenter)
Cruce de caminos (Tele 5) (Presenter)
Buenas Tardes (Tele 5) (Presenter)
Tú dirás (Tele 5) (Presenter)
Cada día (Antena 3) (Presenter, co-director)
Lo que inTeresa (Antena 3) (Presenter)
Especial Rocío Jurado (Antena 3) (Presenter)
El laberinto de la memoria (Telecinco) (Presenter)
La mirada crítica (Telecinco) (Presenter)
Paquirri: 25 años de leyenda (Telecinco) (Presenter)
Rocío Dúrcal: más bonita todavía (Telecinco) (Presenter)
¡Qué tiempo tan feliz!  (Telecinco) (Presenter)
Gran Hermano Revolution (Telecinco) (Special Guest)

Honours 
 Medal of Andalusia (Regional Government of Andalusia, 21 February 2000).
 Gold Medal of Merit in Labour (Kingdom of Spain, 12 June 2017).

References

External links

1941 births
Living people
People from Tétouan
Spanish women journalists
Spanish television personalities
Spanish television presenters
Spanish women writers
Spanish women television presenters
University of Málaga alumni